Claude Lapointe (born October 11, 1968) is a Canadian former ice hockey player. He played in the National Hockey League for the Quebec Nordiques, Colorado Avalanche, Calgary Flames, New York Islanders, and Philadelphia Flyers between 1991 and 2004.

Early life
Lapointe grew up in the city of Lachine, Quebec. It was playing in the Quebec Major Junior Hockey League. He was offered a scholarship by the University of Michigan but he refused it.

Playing career
He was drafted by the Nordiques in the 12th round of the 1988 NHL Draft, with the 234th overall pick. Lapointe spent most of his NHL career with the New York Islanders. He was there from the 1996–97 season to the 2002–03 season. While with the New York Islanders, he received many honors such as many NYI Fan club MVP awards and three Bob Nystrom awards, which is awarded to  the player who most exemplifies leadership, hustle, and dedication. He also received awards for reaching the 800 game mark, and for scoring over 100 goals. Other achievements include being named assistant captain with the Islanders, ranking among the top 3 in the NHL for face-off win percentage for 15 years consecutively, spanning entire career. Similarly, Lapointe was among the league's elite in terms of physical conditioning. In 1999, he represented Canada at the 1999 World Championships. He retired in 2004

Personal life
Lapointe has two sons: Kirk and Kody. He coaches and trains hockey players both on ice and off ice.

Career statistics

Regular season and playoffs

International

External links
 

1968 births
Living people
Calgary Flames players
Canadian ice hockey centres
Colorado Avalanche players
Halifax Citadels players
Ice hockey people from Montreal
Laval Titan players
New York Islanders players
People from Lachine, Quebec
Philadelphia Flyers players
Philadelphia Phantoms players
Quebec Nordiques draft picks
Quebec Nordiques players
Saint John Flames players
SC Bern players
Trois-Rivières Draveurs players
Utah Grizzlies (IHL) players